Nya Doxa is a Swedish book publisher. It was founded in 1990 when it took over parts of the book stock from the bankrupt publishing company Doxa. They publish mostly books within humanities and social science. At present, they publish about 20 new titles a year.

Nya Doxa puts focus on publishing titles of good scientific quality, both the specialized kind and more popular books targeted at a wider public audience, and they also distribute books for three other small Swedish publishers with similar book publication; Thales, Makadam Förlag and Nimrod.

The seat of Nya Doxa is located in the Swedish town of Nora and have 3 employees, excluding the CEO David Stansvik, who has been running Nya Doxa since the start.

External links
 Nya Doxa official website

Book publishing companies of Sweden
Companies based in Örebro County